Community Transit (CT) is the public transit authority of Snohomish County, Washington, United States, excluding the city of Everett, in the Seattle metropolitan area. It operates local bus, paratransit and vanpool service within Snohomish County, as well as commuter buses to Downtown Seattle and Northgate station. CT is publicly funded, financed through sales taxes, farebox revenue and subsidies, with an operating budget of $133.2 million. The city of Everett, which serves as the county seat, is served by Everett Transit, a municipal transit system.

Community Transit, officially the Snohomish County Public Transportation Benefit Area Corporation (SCPTBA), operates a fleet of 225 accessible buses, 54 paratransit vehicles, and 412 vanpool vans, maintained at two bus bases located in the Paine Field industrial area in Everett. Service is provided year-round at 1,500 stops on 46 routes throughout the county public transportation benefit area (PTBA). CT began operation as SCPTBA Public Transit on October 4, 1976, four months after the third attempt to establish public transit in Snohomish County was approved. Renamed Community Transit in 1979, the agency expanded service in its first decades of existence, later taking over King County Metro commuter routes to Seattle in 1989 and adding several cities into its PTBA in the 1980s and 1990s. CT service hours fell during two funding crises in the 2000s, after the passage of Initiative 695 in 1999 and during a severe recession from 2010 to 2012. Despite the cuts, which forced service hours to fall short of rising demand, the agency debuted the state's first bus rapid transit line, Swift, as well as introducing "Double Tall" double-decker buses on its commuter routes to Seattle.

History

Early years (1970s) 

Snohomish County established its public transportation benefit area (PTBA), the first in the state, after municipal corporations for public transportation were added to the Revised Code of Washington by the Washington State Legislature in 1975. The PTBA plan for a countywide bus system was approved during a general election on June 1, 1976, funded by a three-tenths increase of the sales tax rate in member cities.

Snohomish County had previously been served by an interurban railway from Everett to Seattle and coach lines operated by private companies under the Puget Sound Power Company, which were later absorbed by Greyhound. Two previous attempts to establish a bus system, under the Snohomish County Transportation Authority (SNOTRAN) in 1974, were rejected by voters from the entirety of Snohomish County. Heavy opposition came from the residents of Everett because of the high sales tax rate and planned absorption of Everett Transit, acquired by the city in 1969, forcing the SCPTBA to exclude Everett in its successful attempt at creating a bus system. SCPTBA Public Transit began operating in the cities of Brier, Edmonds, Lynnwood, Marysville, Mountlake Terrace, Snohomish and Woodway on October 4, 1976, using 18 leased GMC buses on seven routes carrying 6,414 passengers without fares during the first week.

SCPTBA Public Transit, whose service was known colloquially as the "Blue Bus" for its blue livery, carried 951,200 passengers in its first year of service on 15 local routes and 16 commuter express routes to Downtown Seattle and Northgate, contracted through King County Metro as a continuation of service provided by the Metropolitan Transit Corporation to southern Snohomish County before its merger with Seattle Transit System in 1973. The buses ran for 16 hours a day, charging a base fare of 20 cents (equivalent to $ in ). Early on, the busiest local line was Route R14, accounting for 21 percent of system ridership in the first three months, running from the Edmonds waterfront to Lynnwood and the Boeing Everett Factory. The agency acquired its first federal subsidies from the Urban Mass Transportation Administration for the 1978 fiscal year, to be used on the purchase of 18 new buses as well as bus stop amenities, such as stop signs and shelters.

Growth and contracted service (1980s) 

Community Transit was selected as the official name of the agency on June 19, 1979, recommended by Seattle-based public relations firm McConnell Company ahead of the winners of a public contest held by SCPTBA two years prior. CT continued to grow through the end of the decade, annexing the cities of Arlington, Lake Stevens, Monroe, Granite Falls, Mukilteo, Stanwood and Sultan into the PTBA by 1980; the bus system had the largest growth in ridership within the state in 1980, with local routes gaining 68.3 percent more riders and Metro-operated "Cream Buses" to Seattle gaining 21.4 percent more riders. Metro altered their numbering scheme for Snohomish County routes in 1981, creating the 400-series of routes to coincide with the opening of the state's largest park and ride in Lynnwood (which would later become Lynnwood Transit Center). The annexations of outlying communities in northern and eastern Snohomish County and the completion of park and rides in Edmonds and Mountlake Terrace saw ridership rise to over 3 million passengers by 1983.

Community Transit launched its longest commuter route, between Seattle and Stanwood, in October 1987. They took over the remaining Metro commuter routes to Seattle in 1989, after commuter service was subcontracted to American Transportation Enterprises in 1986. The move to a private carrier was opposed by both Metro and the Amalgamated Transit Union, but the introduction of 49 air conditioned coaches by ATE led to a 25 percent increase in ridership by January 1987. Commuter express service via Interstate 405 from CT park and rides in South Snohomish County to the Eastside cities of Bellevue and Redmond began in 1988 and 1990, respectively, while Seattle service was expanded with weekend service in 1990. The agency dedicated its own  bus base at Kasch Park in 1985, replacing shared operations with the Edmonds School District and Everett Transit, at a cost of $4.8 million (equivalent to $ in ) that was mostly subsidized by the Urban Mass Transportation Administration.

1990s and 2000s

Fraud investigation 
CT was involved in a criminal investigation conducted by the Federal Bureau of Investigation (FBI) in the mid-1990s of Ed's Transmission, a transmission shop in Everett used by the agency for bus parts. Detectives from the FBI and Snohomish County Sheriff seized records from both parties and began a two-month audit of Community Transit management. The auditors released a report that criticized the management style of Executive Director Ken Graska and his department heads, leading to the former's resignation in December 1993 after nine years at his position. Federal prosecutors accused Ralph Woodall, the 50-year-old co-owner of the shop, of 15 counts of mail fraud after intentionally overbilling for transmission repairs. Community Transit Maintenance Director Michael Lynn resigned after confessing that he had accepted gifts from Woodall in exchange for sending all of CT's transmissions to Ed's Transmissions without going through competitive bidding. A U.S. District Court jury found Woodall guilty of 15 counts of mail fraud in December 1996, with Judge John C. Coughenour sentencing him to 2.5 years in federal prison the following May, along with Ed's Transmission being forced to pay a $825,000 settlement after a civil suit was filed.

Proposed consolidations with Everett Transit 

Attempted mergers of Community Transit with Everett Transit have been proposed by the Washington State Legislature and the CT Board since the formation of SNOTRAN in 1974. The relative success of Community Transit in the late 1970s and 1980s prompted the Community Transit Board to propose consolidation with Everett Transit in 1988, though long-term planning under SNOTRAN for both agencies worked under the assumption that there would be no merger by 2000. In 1990, a second proposal was rejected by the Everett City Council after consultants determined that a merger would only save $350,000 per year in deadheading for Community Transit and that both staffs would need to be retained because of the lack of service duplication between the two agencies. Throughout the 1990s, successive legislative bills proposing a merger were passed through the House Transportation Committee, but failed to gain support elsewhere because of successful lobbying from the City of Everett. State voters approved Referendum 49 in November 1998, including state motor-vehicle excise tax revenue for city-run transit in Everett and Yakima. While Everett Transit gained $4.5 million (equivalent to $ in ) in new annual funding, CT was set to lose $1 million (equivalent to $ in ) over the next five years in addition to the $2 million (equivalent to $ in ) used to operate service within Everett annually. The large cuts brought on by the passing of Initiative 695 and subsequent loss of excise tax revenue forced both agencies to consider merging in 2000, with savings of an estimated $1.7 million per year (equivalent to $ in ) according to a study commissioned by Community Transit. As a result of the failed mergers, CT proposed truncating its routes at Everett city limits, but ultimately decided to provide limited-stop service on its routes through Everett to the newly constructed Everett Station in 2002. Community Transit and Everett Transit signed their first partnership agreement in 2007, with Everett helping fund Swift bus rapid transit through its service area and allowing CT to operate the route in exchange for the expansion of ET service into unincorporated areas surrounding Everett. The two agencies further collaborated with Sound Transit and the Washington State Department of Transportation in the construction of the South Everett Freeway Station the following year.

Fleet expansions and new services 
In their most recent expansion in 1997, the Snohomish County PTBA annexed the Eastmont and Silver Firs census-designated places between Everett and Mill Creek, as well as the Tulalip Indian Reservation west of Marysville. During the same year, CT awarded its $31.8 million (equivalent to $ in ) commuter service contract to Grosvenor Bus Lines, which would later fold into First Transit, replacing their first subcontractor, Ryder/ATE Management. The agency introduced the first low-floor articulated buses in the United States into its fleet in 1999, purchasing 17  buses from New Flyer to improve accessibility for older and disabled riders. Service improvements throughout the 1990s, including raising service hours to over 11 million, led to ridership peaking at 8.8 million by the end of the decade and the agency's 100 millionth rider being celebrated in April 2000. The passage of Initiative 695 in 1999, which capped the state motor-vehicle excise tax at $30, forced transit agencies throughout the state to cut service in anticipation of lower revenue. Facing the loss of $18 million (equivalent to $ in ), or 30 percent of its annual operating budget, Community Transit eliminated all weekend service and increased fares on its routes in February 2000. With the service cuts, CT began its VanGO program to donate its retired paratransit minibuses to nonprofit organizations in Snohomish County instead of auctioning them off. Saturday service was reinstated in September 2000, using emergency funds approved by the CT Board, while Sunday service returned in 2001 after the passage of a 0.3 percentage-point tax increase by voters in the PTBA. Further restoration of service came in 2003, with increased frequency and the replacement of 50 buses in the agency's fleet made possible by a budget surplus and the sales tax increase approved in 2002, and in 2005, with increased fares.

Community Transit introduced its current logo and slogan in 2005, replacing an older one in use since 1986 and retaining its blue-and-white color scheme, as part of the roll-out of the first New Flyer Invero buses in the United States. CT began a three-month pilot project in September 2005 that brought Wi-Fi access to buses on its longest route, Route 422 between Stanwood and Seattle, with hopes of attracting customers and remote workers to its routes. The pilot project was deemed a success and expanded into the "Surf and Ride" program on all Route 422 trips in 2006, as well as select trips on Routes 406 and 441 from Edmonds to Seattle and Overlake on the Eastside, respectively; the Wi-Fi program was canceled in 2010, with the removal of equipment in buses brought on by low customer response, budget constraints and the adoption of improved cellular networks that support mobile browsing on smartphones.

CT and First Transit signed their third and most recent contract in 2007, continuing the latter's operation of CT commuter service to Seattle. Community Transit debuted the first double-decker buses in the Puget Sound region during a year-long test in 2007, eventually buying its own fleet of Alexander Dennis Enviro500s for its "Double Tall" fleet to be used on commuter services. A PTBA expansion into the unincorporated areas of Cathcart, Clearview and Maltby was attempted during the 2008 general elections, but failed to gain a majority vote. In November 2009, after three years of planning and a year of construction, Community Transit debuted the first bus rapid transit line in Washington, Swift. The service replaced Route 100 on State Route 99 between Aurora Village in Shoreline and Everett Station, featuring 12-minute headways, off-board fare payment and transit signal priority.

Service cuts and restoration (2010s) 

The Great Recession of the late 2000s and subsequent loss of an estimated $180 million (equivalent to $ in ) in sales tax revenue in Snohomish County forced CT to cut service by 15 percent in June 2010, including the elimination of all service on Sundays and major holidays, to save $16 million (equivalent to $ in ) until 2012. A second cut, with 20 percent of service eliminated, took place in February 2012; the CT Board rejected a major restructure that would have truncated its northern and eastern express service to Seattle at Lynnwood Transit Center during this cut, instead opting to preserve its commuter service. Despite the decline in service hours, Community Transit and Sound Transit had record ridership for Snohomish County routes during the Super Bowl XLVIII parade in Downtown Seattle in February 2014, carrying a total of 22,500 passengers on 50 extra trips into Seattle. In March, the 2014 Oso mudslide destroyed a portion of State Route 530 and forced CT to re-route its service to Darrington through Skagit County, offering one-seat service to Smokey Point and Everett Station in the interim as Route 231. The partial reopening of State Route 530 in June and full reopening in September restored the original Route 230 on its original route, now extended to Smokey Point.

Community Transit began restoring cut service in September 2014, adding 13 percent of its former bus hours primarily to improve midday service. In June 2015, CT restored its Sunday and holiday service as part of a 27,000-hour expansion, representing 20 percent of the 2010 reduction, funded by recovering sales tax revenue and a 25-cent increase in fares the following month. The agency was given approval from the state legislature in July 2015 to increase sales taxes by an additional 0.3%, dependent on voter approval via a ballot measure during the November 2015 election that was eventually won, to fund a new Swift line as well as local service expansion. The second Swift route, the Green Line, opened on March 24, 2019, and cost $73 million to construct. It connects the Seaway Transit Center, a new facility next to the Boeing Everett Factory, to Mill Creek and Canyon Park in Bothell. Following the opening of Northgate station on October 2, 2021, the University District routes were truncated to the station to allow for increased service.

Construction of a third bus rapid transit corridor, the Swift Orange Line, began in April 2022. It is scheduled to open in 2024 alongside the Lynnwood Link Extension, which will also trigger a network restructuring to provide new service in Snohomish County to connect with light rail stations.

Regional projects with Sound Transit 

Community Transit and Everett Transit agreed to break away from SNOTRAN, which served as their planning and administrative body in addition to disbursing federal subsidies, after CT complained of a "lack of communication" between the three agencies. The county agency formally disbanded on December 31, 1994, replaced by the Joint Regional Policy Committee (JRPC) that formed four years prior to coordinate transit planning for the entire Puget Sound region. A regional transit agency was formed in 1993 under the JRPC, organizing a $6.7 billion (equivalent to $ in ) plan for regional transit that was put to a vote on March 14, 1995, failing to pass outside of Seattle, Mercer Island and Shoreline. The plan included a commuter rail line on the BNSF Scenic Subdivision between Everett, Mukilteo, Edmonds and King Street Station in Seattle, a light rail line from Lynnwood to Seattle following Interstate 5, and express bus service to light rail stations. The following November, the smaller "Sound Move" plan was approved at a cost of $3.9 billion (equivalent to $ in ), including commuter rail from Everett to Seattle and express buses on Interstate 5 from Everett and Lynnwood to Seattle and Bellevue.

The regional transit agency, renamed to Sound Transit the following year, began operating its Sound Transit Express buses under contract with Community Transit in September 1999. The new express buses connected park and rides in southwestern Snohomish County, the only part of Community Transit's service area within the Sound Transit taxing district, to Downtown Seattle, including the newly opened, 1,000-stall Ash Way Park & Ride in northern Lynnwood. Sound Transit funded several capital projects to improve bus service on the Interstate 5 corridor, including direct access ramps from HOV lanes to Lynnwood and Ash Way park and rides that opened in 2004 and 2005, respectively. In 2011, the existing Mountlake Terrace park and ride was expanded with an 890-stall parking garage and bus platforms in the median of I-5 connected by a pedestrian bridge.

Commuter rail service to Snohomish County on the Sounder North Line began in December 2003 with a single round-trip connecting Everett and Edmonds to King Street Station in Seattle during rush hour. Service was expanded to a second round-trip in June 2005 and a third round-trip in September 2007, while an infill station opened at Mukilteo in May 2008, also bringing additional service in the form of a fourth round-trip the following September.

An expansion of the Link light rail system in the "Sound Transit 2" package was approved in November 2008, including 54% of southwestern Snohomish County voters, funding the extension of light rail to Lynnwood. The  light rail line will run along Interstate 5 from Northgate station in Seattle to Lynnwood Transit Center and is scheduled to begin construction in 2018 and open for service in 2024. With the passage of Sound Transit 3 in 2016, light rail service to Everett via Paine Field is anticipated to begin service in 2041.

Administration 

Community Transit is administered by a nine-member board, composed of two members of the Snohomish County Council, two elected officials from PTBA cities with populations of 30,000 or more, three elected officials from cities with between 10,000 and 30,000, and two elected officials from cities with less than 10,000, that meets monthly at their headquarters in Everett. The board is led by a non-voting chief executive officer, a position held by Ric Ilgenfritz since January 2021. CT adopted an operating budget of $133.2 million for 2015; 65 to 70 percent of revenue is provided by a 0.9 percent sales tax within the PTBA, the maximum authorized for transit agencies under state law, while a combination of fares and federal subsidies comprise the remainder. The agency employs 579 full-time equivalent persons, divided into eight departments.

CT is headquartered at their Kasch Park Administration Building at 2312 W Casino Road in the Paine Field industrial area of South Everett, located south of the Boeing Everett Factory. The  Merrill Creek operations building opened in 1997 and is the primary bus base for the agency's fleet of buses and vans.

Services 

Community Transit operates fixed bus routes throughout the  Snohomish County PTBA, serving 47 percent of its 542,000 people and 76 percent of its 254,000 jobs. The 46 bus routes serve 1,584 bus stops, of which 257 have a bus shelter—the rest consist of a standalone sign or a sign with a bench. The bus routes are divided into three types of service, numbered according to destination: frequent bus rapid transit on the unnumbered Swift, 24 local routes in the 100s for southern Snohomish County and 200s for northern and eastern Snohomish County, and 22 weekday peak-only commuter express routes from park and rides to the Boeing Everett Factory numbered as the 2X7s, Downtown Seattle in the 400s, and Northgate station (formerly the University of Washington campus) in the 800s. CT and their subcontractor First Transit also operate all-day, all-week Sound Transit Express service to Seattle and Bellevue on six routes numbered in the 500s. Typically, service changes occur in February and September, in response to ridership and requests from the community.

Commuter bus routes to Boeing in Everett, Downtown Seattle and Northgate Station generally originate at one of the 24 Community Transit park and rides and transit centers located throughout Snohomish County, with a total capacity of 8,500 automobiles and 172 bicycles. The largest facilities, primarily located in southwest Snohomish County, include weatherproof bicycle lockers in addition to automobile parking. The majority of park and rides are owned by the Washington State Department of Transportation and maintained by Community Transit and other service providers.

In addition to bus service, CT operates a vanpool program with a fleet of 366 vans originating from the Kasch Park operating base in Everett. The fleet comes in configurations with 7, 12, or 15 seats, with two special vans equipped with wheelchair lifts. Community Transit reports that there are 361 active vanpools using their service, providing 908,488 rides in 2015, the 12th largest vanpool program in the United States that year. CT leases vanpool lots, called "park and pool lots", from local churches and other private parties at 15 locations with a total capacity of 482 parking stalls.

Dial-a-ride transportation (DART) service is also offered by Community Transit, contracted through Senior Services of Snohomish County since 1981. DART paratransit is available for a fare of $2 for qualifying customers within  of local CT routes during regular operating hours. , CT has 4,100 registered DART users that take an average of 700 trips per day. A separate dial-a-ride service, Zip, launched in October 2022 to serve the Alderwood Mall and Lynnwood area. It operates similar to ride-hailing service with fixed fares (including payment via ORCA cards) and is available to all members of the public; trips are requested through an app or phone call as part of the one-year pilot project. Similar micotransit services are under consideration for various cities in Snohomish County as part of Community Transit's long-range plan.

Fares 

Fares on Community Transit buses are priced into three groups: adult, youth, and reduced. Adult fare is charged for passengers between the ages of 19 and 64, youth fare is charged for passengers 18 years old or younger, and the reduced fare is charged for passengers over the age of 65 or those with disabilities or Medicare card holders. Fares also change based on service level, with local service within Snohomish County costing the least and commuter service to Seattle being more expensive. On July 1, 2019, Community Transit introduced a low-income fare as part of the regional ORCA Lift program. Youth fares were made free with valid ID on September 1, 2022, as part of a state grant program that lasts until 2039.

The regional ORCA card was introduced as an integrated smart card for transit agencies in the Puget Sound region on April 20, 2009, allowing users to load monthly passes and value through an e-purse web interface. The card also allowed free transfers within a two-hour period between transit agencies of equal value, with the difference for higher fare subtracted from the e-purse or prompting for cash. While initially available for no fee, effective March 1, 2010, a $5 cost was added when ordering a standard adult or youth ORCA card. CT removed their paper transfers on January 1, 2010, after the ORCA card made them obsolete.

Community Transit also offers monthly passes through local higher education institutions, including Edmonds College, the University of Washington, Cascadia College, and the Lynnwood Campus of Central Washington University.

Dial-a-ride transportation, a type of paratransit service operated by Community Transit, has a flat fare of $2.50 without discounts or separate categories. ORCA cards are not accepted on DART, replaced by tickets and monthly passes for frequent users.

Fleet 

, CT maintains and operates a fleet of 700 vehicles from its operating bases at Kasch Park and Merrill Creek. Buses typically are powered by diesel engines, with the exception of the 30 hybrid diesel-electric buses used on Swift Bus Rapid Transit and some local routes. Community Transit expects to purchase 55 to 60 new buses by 2027 to support increased transit service and replace older vehicles. The agency began testing several battery electric buses in early 2023.

Since 1995, all Community Transit buses are low-floored and equipped with a hydraulic or pneumatic "kneeling" device in addition to wheelchair lifts for 6-wheeled motorized wheelchairs. CT buses have also feature two bicycle racks located in front of the windshield since 1996; Swift bus rapid transit buses have three bicycle racks located inside the vehicle for reduced dwell times.

In addition to its bus fleet, Community Transit maintains 408 vans for its vanpool program and 52 paratransit minibuses equipped with wheelchair lifts for dial-a-ride service. Retired vanpool and DART vehicles are donated to local non-profit organizations through the VanGO program, which has gifted 106 vans since its establishment in 2000.

Double Tall 

Community Transit has a fleet of double-decker buses used on commuter routes from park and rides to Downtown Seattle, named the "Double Tall" in reference to the double tall cup size at Starbucks, a coffee chain founded and headquartered in Seattle. The Alexander Dennis Enviro500 was introduced during a one-year pilot project in 2007, on lease from Alexander Dennis for $15,000 per month. The ,  Enviro500 seated 77 to 81, with standing room for 20 additional passengers, replacing the capacity of the standard articulated buses used on the commuter routes in a smaller footprint. Prior to the end of the trial in 2008, CT placed an order of 23 Enviro500s, scheduled to be delivered and put into service in 2010; the initial order was not fulfilled until 2011, when manufacturing was moved to an ElDorado plant in Riverside, California to meet federal Buy America Act requirements. A second order of 17 Enviro500s, to replace older articulated buses, was made in 2013 and went into service in late 2015.

Sound Transit introduced five of its own double-decker buses in 2015 for use on their Snohomish County routes under contract with Community Transit. Sound Transit plans to eventually replace its entire Snohomish County fleet with double-deckers in the near-term future, beginning with 32 additional buses in 2018. Community Transit also ordered 17 double-decker buses, with an option to purchase 40 more, as part of the joint procurement with Sound Transit and Kitsap Transit.

The fleet of 45 double-decker buses operated directly by Community Transit is, the second-largest double-decker fleet of any public transit agency in the United States, behind RTC Transit of Las Vegas, Nevada and ahead of Unitrans of Davis, California and Antelope Valley Transit Authority of Antelope Valley, California.

Current bus fleet 

NOTE: This table was edited by someone not familiar with editing Wikipedia. It is accurate following a FOIA request on August 11, 2021. The editor of this table is not sure of how to cite it.

References

External links 

Dial-a-Ride

Bus transportation in Washington (state)
Sound Transit
Transit agencies in Washington (state)
Transportation in Seattle
Transportation in Snohomish County, Washington
1976 establishments in Washington (state)